Colorado or Colorados Formation may refer to:

Argentina
 Colorado Formation, Argentina, a Campanian geologic formation of La Pampa Province
 Los Colorados Formation, a Triassic geologic formation of La Rioja and San Juan Provinces
 Los Colorados Formation, Paleogene, a Paleogene geologic formation of Salta Province; see Salta Basin
 Quebrada de los Colorados Formation, an Eocene geologic formation of Salta Province; see Salta Basin
 Cañón del Colorado Formation, an Early Jurassic geologic formation of San Juan Province
 Río Colorado Subgroup, a Late Cretaceous geologic subgroup of Neuquén and Río Negro Provinces

Elsewhere
 Colorado Group, a Late Cretaceous geologic unit of the United States and Canada
 Cerro Colorado Formation, an Early Cretaceous geologic formation of Chile
 Colorado Formation, Colombia, an Oligocene geologic formation of Colombia; see 

 Colorado City Formation, a Late Triassic geologic formation of Texas

See also
 Chinle Formation, on the Colorado Plateau, southwestern United States